Dinah Rose Banda (born 27 January 2001) is a Zimbabwean footballer who plays as a forward for Queen Lozikeyi Academy and the Zimbabwe women's national team.

Club career
Banda played for Queen Lozikeyi Academy in Zimbabwe.

International career
Banda capped for Zimbabwe at senior level during the 2020 COSAFA Women's Championship.

References

2001 births
Living people
Zimbabwean women's footballers
Women's association football forwards
Zimbabwe women's international footballers